Gay Street may also refer to:

Gay Street, West Sussex
Gay Street, Bath, Somerset
Gay Street (Baltimore)
Gay Street (Knoxville)
Gay Street (Manhattan), New York City
Gay Street (Rome), a neighborhood